Tropic Air is an airline operating scheduled services from Belize. Founded in 1979 by John Greif III with just a single airplane and two employees, Tropic has steadily grown to a fleet of 17 light aircraft. The airline flies to 17 destinations in Belize, Mexico, Guatemala, and Honduras. The airline also offers various sightseeing tours.

Destinations
Belize
Ambergris Caye - John Greif II Airport
Belize City
Sir Barry Bowen Municipal Airport
Philip S. W. Goldson International Airport
Belmopan - Hector Silva Airstrip
Caye Caulker - Caye Caulker Airport
Corozal - Corozal Airport
Dangriga - Dangriga Airport
Orange Walk - Orange Walk Airport
Placencia - Placencia Airport
Punta Gorda - Punta Gorda Airport
San Ignacio - Matthew Spain Airport

Guatemala
Flores - Mundo Maya International Airport
Guatemala City - La Aurora International Airport

Honduras
Roatan - Juan Manuel Gálvez International Airport

Mexico
Cancun - Cancún International Airport

El Salvador
San Salvador - El Salvador International Airport

Fleet 
The Tropic Air fleet consists of the following aircraft:

A de Havilland Canada DHC-6 Twin Otter is also leased seasonally.

Accidents and incidents
4 December 2014: a Cessna 208B Grand Caravan overran the runway upon landing at the Belize City Municipal Airport and came to rest in the waters of the Caribbean Sea. Nobody was hurt.
 17 November 2017: a Cessna 208B Grand Caravan on a domestic flight to Punta Gorda Airport in Belize with seven people on board, including the Acting Prime Minister of Belize Patrick Faber and Agriculture Minister Godwin Hulse, ditched in the sea just after it lifted off the runway at Placencia Airport, after one of its main landing gear wheels hit a vehicle. Several occupants of the aircraft and a passenger in the vehicle were injured, but there were no fatalities. The runway at Placencia Airport is very close to a road that has boom gates to stop vehicles while aircraft are landing or taking off; one of the gates reportedly failed to deploy.

References

External links

Tropic Air
Tropic Air Tours

Airlines of Belize
Airlines established in 1979
Belize City
Latin American and Caribbean Air Transport Association
Belizean brands
1979 establishments in North America